David Bisbal Edición Europea is an album by Spanish pop- rock singer David Bisbal.

Album information
This special edition CD was released in Spain in October 2006. In this new CD David Bisbal interprets songs in the English language such as "The sun ain't gonna shine (anymore), "Cry for me" and "Stop loving you." These new songs will be accompanied by eleven of the artists past hits including "Ave María," "Dígale," "Lloraré las penas" and "Bulería."

Track listing
 "The Sun Ain't Gonna Shine (Anymore)"
 "Me Derrumbo (Crumbling)"
 "Oye el Boom"
 "Bulería"
 "Dígale"
 "Cry for Me"
 "Quiero perderme en tu cuerpo"
 "Lloraré las penas"
 "Esta Ausencia"
 "Desnúdate mujer"
 "Cómo olvidar"
 "Fuiste mía"
 "Ave María"
 "Stop Loving You"
 "Let's Make History" (a duet with Joana Zimmer) (bonus track)

References

David Bisbal compilation albums
2006 greatest hits albums
Spanish-language compilation albums